The 59th National Film Awards, presented by the Directorate of Film Festivals, honoured the best of Indian cinema for 2011 and took place on 3 May 2012 at Vigyan Bhavan, New Delhi. Awards were presented in 38 categories in the Feature Films section, 20 categories in the Non-Feature Films section and two categories for the Best Writing on Cinema section; 41 jury members chose the winners from 392 entries. The ceremony was hosted by actors Vinay Pathak and Saumya Tandon. Awards were presented by the Vice-President of India, Mohammad Hamid Ansari. The ceremony was broadcast live on three television channels, eleven All India Radio stations, and webcast live.

Deool, a Marathi film,  and Byari, the first and only Beary film, shared the award for the Best Feature Film. The award for the Best Non-Feature Film was given to the Hindi‐English documentary And We Play On. The book, R. D. Burman: The Man, The Music, co-authored by Anirudha Bhattacharjee and Balaji Vittal, won the Best Book on Cinema; Assamese film critic Manoj Barpujari was declared the Best Film Critic. Gurvinder Singh won the best feature film direction award for his directorial debut, Anhe Ghore Da Daan. For the film Deool, Girish Kulkarni won the awards for Best Actor and Best Dialogue; Bollywood actress Vidya Balan won the Best Actress award for The Dirty Picture. The Dadasaheb Phalke Award, regarded as the most prestigious recognition in Indian cinema, was given to the veteran Bengali actor Soumitra Chatterjee for his contribution to Bengali cinema.

Selection process 

The Directorate of Film Festivals invited nominations for the 2012 award ceremony on 26 December 2011. Feature and Non-Feature Films certified by Central Board of Film Certification between 1 January 2011, and 31 December 2011, were eligible for the film award categories. The written material on Indian cinema published in Indian print media during the same period were eligible for the best writing on cinema section. The dubbed, revised or copied versions of a film or translation, abridgements, edited or annotated works and reprints were ineligible for the awards. The deadline for submissions was 17 January 2012.

The Feature Film category received 186 entries in 19 languages, marking the highest number of submissions in the history of the National Film Awards, as of 2011. A total of 156 entries were received in the Non-Feature Films category along with 28 books and 22 articles which were submitted for the Best Writing in Cinema.

Awards 
The National Film Awards are grouped into three sections: Feature Films, Non-Feature Films and Writing on Cinema. On 7 March 2012, in a press conference held at Shastri Bhavan, New Delhi, the winners for the 2012 award ceremony were announced. A lifetime achievement award, named after Dadasaheb Phalke, was awarded to a film personality for an outstanding contribution to the Indian Cinema. The winners were awarded a medallion, a cash prize and a certificate of merit.

Dadasaheb Phalke Award 

Introduced in 1969, the Dadasaheb Phalke Award is the highest award given to recognise the contributions of film personalities towards the development of Indian cinema and for distinguished contributions to the medium, its growth and promotion. A committee consisting of five personalities from the Indian film industry was appointed to evaluate the Dadasaheb Phalke award nominations for 2011. Following were the jury members:

The Dadasaheb Phalke award for 2011 was announced on 23 March 2012. Actor Soumitra Chatterjee won the award for his contribution to Indian cinema, predominantly in Bengali cinema. Chatterjee was a regular in Satyajit Ray films, has worked with other notable directors such as Mrinal Sen and Tapan Sinha in a career lasting over 50 years.

Feature films 
Feature films were awarded at national and regional levels. A Marathi film, Deool and a Beary film, Byari, shared the National Film Award for Best Feature Film. Deool became the third Marathi film to win the honour after Shyamchi Aai (1953) and Shwaas (2003). The film's author and lead actor, Girish Kulkarni, won the awards for Best Actor and Best Dialogues. Byari is the first feature film ever made in the Beary language. In this section, 24 films won awards, and six films, including Deool, the Punjabi film Anhe Ghore Da Daan, another Marathi film Balgandharva, a Bengali film Ranjana Ami Ar Ashbona and two Hindi films Chillar Party and The Dirty Picture, won three awards each.

Jury 

For the Feature Film section, six committees were formed based on the different geographic regions in India. The two-tier evaluation process included a central committee and five regional committees. The central committee, headed by the actor Rohini Hattangadi, included the heads of each regional committee and five other jury members. At regional level, each committee consisted of one chief and four members. The chief and one non-chief member of each regional committee were selected from outside that geographic region. The table below names the jury members for the central and regional committees:

Central Jury

Northern Region: 

Eastern Region: 

Western Region: 

Southern Region I: 

Southern Region II:

All India Awards 

At national level, feature films competed in 29 categories. The Swarna Kamal (Golden Lotus Award) was awarded in five categories, the Rajat Kamal (Silver Lotus Award) in the rest. In this edition, the Golden Lotus Award for the Best Animation Film and eight Silver Lotus Awards were not announced. The awards given were as follows:

Golden Lotus Award 
All the winners were awarded with a Swarna Kamal (Golden Lotus Award), a certificate and a cash prize.

Silver Lotus Award 

All the winners were awarded with a Rajat Kamal (Silver Lotus Award), a certificate and a cash prize.

Regional Awards 

National Film Awards are also given to the best films in the regional languages of India. Awards for the regional languages are categorised as per their mention in the Eighth schedule of the Constitution of India. Awardees included producers and directors of the film. No films in languages other than those specified in the Schedule VIII of the Constitution were eligible.

All the winners were awarded with Rajat Kamal (Silver Lotus Award), a certificate and cash prize. Following were the awards given:

Non-Feature Films 

In the Non-Feature Film section, 21 films won awards. Three films—Panchakki, There is Something in the Air and Tiger Dynasty—won three awards each. There is Something in the Air also won the award for best direction—one of the Golden Lotus awards for Non-Feature Films. Three Silver Lotus Awards from Non-Feature Films section were not awarded.

Jury 
A committee of seven, headed by director Romesh Sharma, was appointed to evaluate the Non-Feature Films entries. The jury members were:

Golden Lotus Award 
All the winners were awarded with Swarna Kamal (Golden Lotus Award), a certificate and cash prize.

Silver Lotus Award 

All the winners were awarded with Rajat Kamal (Silver Lotus Award) and cash prize.

Best Writing on Cinema 

The Best Writing on Cinema awards are intended to encourage the study and appreciation of cinema as an art form and the dissemination of information and critical appreciation of the medium through books, articles, reviews etc.

Jury 
A committee of three, headed by the National Award-winning writer Vijaya Mulay was appointed to evaluate the nominations for the best writing on Indian cinema. The jury members were as follows:

Golden Lotus Award 

Official Name: Swarna Kamal

All the winners were awarded with Swarna Kamal (Golden Lotus Award), cash prize and a certificate.

Awards not given 

Across all the sections, 12 out of 60 awards were not presented. Some were not awarded because no entries were submitted and for others, no suitable films were found. All the awards for the Best Writing on Cinema section were awarded. The following awards from the other two sections were not given:

Feature films

 Best Animated Film
 Best Film on Environment Conservation / Preservation
 Best Film on Family Welfare
 Best Film on National Integration
 Best Film on Other Social Issues
 Best Feature Film in Assamese
 Best Feature Film in English
 Best Feature Film in Oriya
 Best Feature Film in Telugu

Non-Feature Films

 Best Animation Film
 Best Agricultural Film
 Best Scientific Film

Award ceremony 

The awards presentation ceremony took place on 3 May 2012, at Vigyan Bhavan, New Delhi. The ceremony was presided over by the Vice-President of India, Mohammad Hamid Ansari. Other dignitaries present were Ambika Soni (Minister of Information and Broadcasting), Vinod Lamba (President of Film Federation of India), Dharmesh Tiwari (President of Federation of Western India Cine Employees), and two Ministers of State for Information and Broadcasting, C. M. Jatua and R. Jagathrakshkan. The chairpersons of the jury for the three awards sections were also present. The show was hosted by Hindi film actor Vinay Pathak and Hindi television actress, Saumya Tandon. It was broadcast live on the television channels Doordarshan 1, DD India and DD News; on eleven All India Radio stations; and on the official websites of the Directorate of Film Festivals and the Ministry of Information and Broadcasting. The public screenings of the award-winning films were scheduled from 1 June 2012, to 10 June 2012, at the Siri Fort Auditorium II, New Delhi.

To mark the centenary of Indian cinema, the ceremony started with clips of the first full-length Indian feature film, Raja Harishchandra (1913). Directed by Dadasaheb Phalke, this silent film was released on 3 May 1913 at Coronation Cinema, Mumbai. To honour this historic event, Soni announced that 2013 would be observed as the centenary year of Indian Cinema and that the National Film Awards ceremony would be held on 3 May every year. She also announced that a National Heritage Mission would be set up to digitise and restore all audio and video tapes of Indian films. A Museum of Indian Cinema would also be inaugurated at the Gulshan Mahal, Mumbai, before May 2013.

Rajiv Mehrotra of the Public Service Broadcasting Trust won his twentieth National Film Award. The acclaimed Kannada director Girish Kasaravalli received his 13th National Film Award when his film Koormavatara won the Best Feature Film in Kannada award. The dress designer Neeta Lulla won her fourth award for the costumes in Balgandharva. Also, eleven child artists were given Best Child Artist Awards for their performances.

Three award-winners—Anand Bhate, Roopa Ganguly and Amitabh Bhattacharya, who won the award for Best Male Playback Singer, Best Female Playback Singer and Best Lyrics respectively—performed live during the ceremony. Both the singers performed their award-winning songs—Bhate sang "Chinmaya Sakal Hridaya" from the Marathi film Balgandharva and Ganguly performed "Dure Kothao Dure Dure" from her film Abosheshey. Bhattacharya was accompanied by singer-songwriter Amit Trivedi for the song "Agar Zindagi" from I Am.

Controversy 

After the awards were announced on 7 March 2012, Enajori.com, a society which promotes cultural heritage of Assam, filed a petition against the jury's decision for not considering Ekhon Nedekha Nodir Xhipare as an Assamese film and rejecting its nomination. In response to the plea the Delhi High Court issued a notice to the Ministry of Information and Broadcasting, the Directorate of Film Festivals, the Central Board of Film Certification, Rohini Hattangadi—chairperson of Feature Film section, and Hiren Bora—a jury member for the Feature Film section. After examining the documents submitted for the selection of regional films, the High Court dismissed the plea. The proceedings revealed that Ekhon Nedekha Nodir Xhipare, and other films from the eastern region, were previewed and rejected by the jury.

References 

Award ceremony

External links 

Official websites

 Official Page for Directorate of Film Festivals, India
 59th National Film Award 2012 Ad Campaign
 59th National Film Awards: Ceremony Stills
 59th National Film Awards: Ceremony Videos
 National Film Awards Archives
 59th National Film Awards: Regulations for submission
 Public Screening of Award-winning Films Function Stills
 59th National Film Awards: Official Catalogue
 Directorate of Film Festivals' Channel at YouTube (run by the Directorate of Film Festivals)

Other resources

 59th National Film Awards announcement (Video)
 National Film Awards at IMDb

National Film Awards (India) ceremonies
2012 Indian film awards